Rekkit Rabbit (known as Rekkit in France) is a French animated television series created by David Michel and was produced by Marathon Media in co-production with Disney XD for the first season and Zodiak Kids for the second, in association with TF1. It premiered in March 11, 2011 in France on TF1.

Episodes

Season 1 (2011)
 The Arrival
 Hare Ball
 Shepherd of Hamsters   
 The Moustache
 Convict Furniture
 Udder Chaos
 Crayfish Boy
 A Spy in the Ointment
 Rekkit Sings 
 The Invitation
 Cool Fool
 Head Ache
 Cabbage Heads

Season 2 (2011)
 Harem Scarem
 Long Days Journey Into Nothing
 Little Mister Potato Guy
 Airheads
 MMM Butterfly
 Photo Finished
 Sell It Rekkit
 The Twins Save Rekkit
 Tale of the Missing Tail
 Rabbits Prefer Gentlemen
 Carpet Ninjas
 Fuzzy Was He
 Revenge of the Kitty Cat

Season 3 (2013)
 Don't Upset The Yeti
 Mind Reader
 Breaking Rules Are For Fools
 Boy Ahoy
 Tortoise and Harebrained
 Abraca-Oh No!
 Fast and Injurious
 See You in My Dreams
 Rekkit has a Secret
 Cooking Magic
 The One Where Bill Gets Rekkit for a While
 InvisiBob
 Smelly Jay

References

2010s French animated television series
2011 French television series debuts
French children's animated comedy television series
TF1 original programming
Disney XD original programming
Television series by Banijay
Animated television series about rabbits and hares
Anime-influenced Western animated television series